Mount Marr is a rock peak which rises above the surrounding ice surface  south of Johnston Peak and  west of Douglas Peak, in Enderby Land, Antarctica. It was discovered in January 1930 by the British Australian New Zealand Antarctic Research Expedition (BANZARE) under Douglas Mawson and was named after James W.S. Marr, a zoologist on the expedition, whose services were lent to BANZARE by the British Discovery Investigations Committee.

See also
Latham Peak

References

Mountains of Enderby Land